This is a list of the Sites of Special Scientific Interest (SSSIs) in the Bridgend Area of Search (AoS).

History
This Area of Search was formed from parts of the previous AoS of Mid Glamorgan, with one site, Penycastell, coming from West Glamorgan.

Sites
 Blackmill Woodlands
 Bryn–bach, Cefn Cribwr
 Brynna a Wern Tarw
 Caeau Cefn Cribwr
 Coedymwstwr Woodland
 Cwm Cyffog
 Cwm Du Woodlands
 Cwm Risca Meadow
 Cynffig-Kenfig
 Daren y Dimbath
 Merthyr Mawr
 Penycastell, Cefn Cribwr
 Stormy Down
 Waun Cimla
 Waun-fawr, Cefn Cribwr

Former sites
 Cwm Caner Mawr: the valley of the Nant Caner Mawr, a tributary of the River Ogmore in the community of Coychurch Higher. The valley floor is a mire with flushes.

See also
 List of SSSIs by Area of Search

References

 
Bridgend